Lobban is a surname. Notable people with the name include:

Greg Lobban, (born 1992), British squash player
Hartley Lobban (born 1922), Jamaican-born English cricketer
Iain Lobban, (born 1960), director of British signals intelligence agency GCHQ
Mary C. Lobban (1922–1982), British physiologist
Michael Lobban, British legal scholar
Richard Lobban, American anthropologist and archaeologist

Scottish surnames